James Airey may refer to:
James Talbot Airey (1812–1898), British Army officer
Jim Airey (born 1941), Australian motorcycle speedway rider